Abdulkadir Özgen (born 8 September 1986) is a Turkish-German professional footballer who plays as a forward.

Career 
Özgen began his career with TSV Donnerberg and SV Breinig. In 2006, he joined Alemannia Aachen where he signed his first professional contract. In summer 2010, he joined Kayserispor and moved to Bucaspor in January 2011.

On 28 December 2015 it was confirmed, that Özgen had signed for Adana Demirspor.

In August 2016, Özgen joined Balıkesirspor.

Personal life 
Özgen's family immigrated to Germany from Turkey, but his birthplace is the North Rhine-Westphalia city of Stolberg.

References

 Balıkesirspor Abdülkadir Özgen'i kadrosuna kattı, hurriyet.com.tr, 24 June 2016

External links
 

1986 births
German people of Turkish descent
People from Aachen (district)
Sportspeople from Cologne (region)
Footballers from North Rhine-Westphalia
Living people
German footballers
Turkish footballers
Association football forwards
Alemannia Aachen players
Kayserispor footballers
Bucaspor footballers
Sivasspor footballers
Samsunspor footballers
Manisaspor footballers
Şanlıurfaspor footballers
Adana Demirspor footballers
Balıkesirspor footballers
24 Erzincanspor footballers
Bayrampaşaspor footballers
Oberliga (football) players
Bundesliga players
2. Bundesliga players
Süper Lig players
TFF First League players
TFF Second League players
TFF Third League players